Elisa Pérez de las Heras (born 10 June 1947) is a Mexican equestrian. She competed in two events at the 1972 Summer Olympics.

References

1947 births
Living people
Mexican female equestrians
Olympic equestrians of Mexico
Equestrians at the 1972 Summer Olympics
Pan American Games medalists in equestrian
Pan American Games gold medalists for Mexico
Pan American Games silver medalists for Mexico
Equestrians at the 1971 Pan American Games
Place of birth missing (living people)
Medalists at the 1971 Pan American Games
20th-century Mexican women